The 2009–10 Ukrainian League Cup was the only season of Ukraine's football knockout competition designated for the members of the Ukrainian Second League and amateur clubs. The main purpose of this tournament was to supplement the 2009–2010 playing calendar of the Second League clubs whose number had declined remarkably triggering some talks of reforming the Ukrainian Second League. Currently amateur clubs are invited at the discretion of their respective regional football associations.

Historical scope 
The tournament was organized after a few mini-tournaments of the PFL Cup had taken place in the span of less than a couple of years. The PFL Cup competitions involved united teams of different leagues such as two from the second and one from the first and the students, players of which had earned a few gold medals in several international competitions (see Universiada). At first the League Cup was supposed to be an extension of those PFL tournaments, but later was reorganized as a supplementary competition to the Second League championship of 2009–2010. A chronic problem follows the Second League especially in recent years as several clubs of the league have a difficult time just to finish their season, not even worrying about winning anything. That, of course, reflects negatively on the performance not only of a club, but the whole league. A new working commission was organized in 2010 to offer an alternative for the Second League clubs structure of competitions which was supposed to be presented for the 2010–2011 season. Please, note that the League Cup is not such an authentic tournament as a similar competition involving exclusively the Second League clubs had taken place in 1999–2001 known as the Cup of the Second League.

Organization

Start 
The Cup began with a group tournament where teams from Druha Liha and amateur level competitors participated. At this stage all 24 teams were divided into eight groups. The best two teams out of each group advanced to the next round of the competition (second round) while all the last placed participants were eliminated. In the second round teams were paired with each other with the winners of each group playing at home. The winner of each pair advanced to the next round (quarter-finals). The Quarter-finals took place in the same manner. The Semi-finals consisted of two home-away matches, while the Final took place at a neutral field.

The winners of this competition were awarded the Cup and the prize money (150,000 Hryvnia) from Umbro, the general sponsor of the event.

Initially FC Luzhany (town of Luzhany, Chernivtsi Oblast) was set to participate in the competition, but was eventually replaced by FC Volyn-Tsement Zdolbuniv. On March 1, 2010 it was decided to suspend the competition due to a lack of funds. The clubs FC Dnister Ovidiopol, PFC Oleksandria, and FC Arsenal Bila Tserkva were represented in the competition by their junior teams (doubles). Several clubs officially quit the competition (FC Khodak Cherkasy, FC Dnister Ovidiopol, PFC Olexandria), while FC Dnipro-75 Dnipropetrovsk was excluded from the Professional Football League due to unpaid debts. The Rivne Oblast clubs (Veres and Volyn) and Teplovyk Yuzhnoukrainsk informed the PFL during the winter break of their unwillingness to continue in the competition.

After winter break 
On March 16 it was decided to resume the competition. The following clubs were given until March 20 to pay off their debts to the referees: Teplovyk, Olexandria, Arsenal, Volyn-Tsement, Veres, Ros, Olympik, Tytan, and Dnipro-75. Umbro became the official partner of the competition and its title sponsor.

When the Second round pairs were formed a few teams that finished last advanced due to numerous withdrawals of other clubs. Three teams (Lviv-2, Ros, and Myr) got a bye straight to the Quarter-finals.

Competition schedule

First round (group stage)

Group A 

Notes:

Group B 

Notes:
 Rivne Oblast clubs (Veres and Volyn) withdrew from the competition during the winter break.
 Volyn-Tsement Zdolbuniv (simply as Volyn Zdolbuniv) is from the small city of Zdolbuniv.

Group C 

Notes:
Dnister was fielding its junior team (double) as its main team was competing in the First League.
On March 1, 2010 Dnister withdrew form the competition, while Teplovyk withdrew earlier during the winter break.
 Teplovyk Yuzhnoukrainsk is from the small city of Yuzhnoukrainsk, Mykolaiv Oblast.

Group D 

Notes:
 Spartak Molodizhne is from the village of Molodizhne, an adjacent suburb of Simferopol, Crimea.
 Myr Hornostaivka is from the village of Hornostaivka, Novotroitske Raion, Kherson Oblast.

Group E 

Notes:
Olexandria was fielding its junior team (double) as its main team participates in the competitions of the First League.
On March 1, 2010 Olexandria and Khodak withdrew from the competition. Hirnyk-Sport was offered and accepted a placed in the next round.
 Khodak Cherkasy is an amateur club from Cherkasy.

Group F 

Notes:
Arsenal Bila Tserkva was fielding its junior team (double) as its main team was not playing in the Second League any longer.
The game Ros – Zenit originally finished 0:1 (Zenit's victory), however due to the fact that Zenit fielded an unregistered player 'Zaza Tsotskhalashvili' the Bila Tserkva's club was awarded a technical victory (3:0) by the decision of the Disciplinary Committee of PFL on October 22, 2009.
Game Ros – Arsenal-d 2:2 took place at the training ground of FC Arsenal Bila Tserkva in the town of Shkarivka. Shkarivka is a suburb of Bila Tserkva city, which is located six miles west of it.

Group G 

Notes:

Group H 

Notes:
Dnipro-75 were excluded from all competitions organized by the PFL for their unpaid debts. The place of Dnipro-75 was granted to and excepted by Olympik.

Bracket

Second Round (round of 16) 

Notes:

Quarterfinals 

Notes:
 In the game Hirnyk-Sport – Ros Dorohan (Ros) was not able to score a penalty in the 61st minute. In the same game Skliarenko (Hirnyk-Sport) was sent off in the 43rd minute for his second caution.

Semifinals 

This stage was scheduled to take place in two-leg (home-away) match-ups. The first leg was played on April 28, 2010 and the second leg – May 5, 2010.

First Leg

Second Leg 

Illichivets-2 1–1 Hirnyk-Sport on aggregate. Hirnyk-Sport won on away goals.

Myr Hornostaivka 0–2 Nyva Vinnytsia on aggregate.

Notes:
 In the game Myr – Nyva Dotsenko was not able to convert his penalty kick opportunity in the 15th minute, due to an excellent save on the part of Nyva's goalie Skybenko.

Final 

Initially set for May 29, the final took place on a neutral ground on June 6, 2010. Surprisingly the PFL picked Oleksandia's Nika Stadium which is 71 km (~46 mi) or about an hour drive from the city of Komsomolsk and 387 km (~255 mi) from Vinnytsia. As a justification, the main reason can be drawn from the fact that it lies in the heartland of Ukraine, and, thus, such a game could draw a greater audience.

Top goalscorers 

In parentheses are goals scored from a penalty spot.

Note:
Petruk scored three goals in the tournament, with one of his scored in the game Ros – Zenit which was later recognized void. That goal is included in this record as the result's cancellation is a mere administrative formality.
Polusmak (Zenit) managed to score two own goals in four games (one was recognized void).
Please, note that Bredis (Bastion Illichivsk) is a veteran of Odessa football. He used to compete for the predecessor of Bastion, FC Portovyk Illichivsk in the Second League as well as various national cup competitions.

See also 
Ukrainian Second League 2009–10
Ukrainian First League 2009–10
2009–10 Ukrainian Cup
Ukrainian Second League Cup

External links 
 Official website 
 Competition Statute

References 

Ukrainian League Cup
League Cup
Ukrainian League Cup